Kho Wang is a district in the south of Yasothon province in northeastern Thailand.

History
Kho Wang was once called Non Kho village, but a monk named Wang from Kanthararom district in Sisaket province came to live and teach in the area. The monk so inspired faith in the people of the region that many moved to the village, and the villagers changed the name of the village to Kho Wang in honor of the monk.

Geography
Neighboring districts are (from the north clockwise): Maha Chana Chai of Yasothon Province; Khueang Nai of Ubon Ratchathani province; Yang Chum Noi and Rasi Salai of Sisaket province.

Administration
The district is divided into four sub-districts (tambons), with 45 villages (mubans).

Schools
The secondary schools in Kho Wang are:
Kho Wang Witthayakhom School (โรงเรียนค้อวังวิทยาคม)
Bandongmaree School (โรงเรียนบ้านดงมะหรี่)

Districts of Yasothon province